Hart to Hart is an American mystery television series that premiered on August 25, 1979, on ABC. The show stars Robert Wagner and Stefanie Powers as Jonathan and Jennifer Hart, respectively, a wealthy couple who lead a glamorous jetset lifestyle and regularly find themselves working as unpaid detectives in order to solve crimes in which they become embroiled. The series was created by novelist and television writer Sidney Sheldon. The series ended after five seasons on May 22, 1984, but was followed by eight made-for-television movies, from 1993 to 1996.

Premise
The premise of the show is summed up in the opening credits sequence, narrated by Max, the Harts' majordomo (Lionel Stander), as he introduces the characters:

Beginning with Season 2 onward, the opening lines were slightly changed:

Jonathan Hart (Robert Wagner) is the CEO of Hart Industries, a global conglomerate based in Los Angeles. His wife Jennifer (Stefanie Powers) is a freelance journalist. Living the jetset lifestyle, the Harts often find themselves involved in cases of smuggling, theft, corporate and international espionage and, most commonly, murder. At their opulent Bel Air estate, they are assisted by Max (Lionel Stander), their shared mansion's loyal, gravel-voiced majordomo, who also helps with their cases. The Harts's beloved pet dog is a Löwchen called Freeway, so named because he was a stray that they found wandering on the freeway. The Harts own a Mercedes-Benz 300 TD diesel wagon, a dark green Rolls-Royce Corniche convertible (replacing the Series III Bentley custom cabriolet in the first season), and a yellow Mercedes-Benz SL roadster (1979 450 SL, replaced by a 1981 380 SL) with personalized California vanity plates "3 HARTs", "2 HARTs", and "1 HART" respectively. The opening credits sequence (stock footage drawn from the series pilot) also shows Jonathan Hart driving a red Dino 246 GTS. They also own a Grumman Gulfstream II private jet, which is featured at the start of the opening credits.

Critics have long noted that the premise of Hart to Hart strongly resembles that of The Thin Man series of 1930s and 1940s films and 1950s The Thin Man television series, which also depicted a wealthy and glamorous crime-fighting couple that had a dog, but no children.

Production
Screenwriter and novelist Sidney Sheldon had originally written a script for CBS, titled Double Twist, in the early 1970s; it was about a married couple who were also both spies. The script remained unfilmed for several years before producers Aaron Spelling and Leonard Goldberg decided to update the idea for a potential television series. They offered the script to screenwriter Tom Mankiewicz, who had by that time written several screenplays, including three of the James Bond films.

Their instruction to Mankiewicz was to update the script to make it more contemporary and viable for a potential weekly series. They also told Mankiewicz that if his draft was successful, he would also be able to direct the pilot episode himself. Mankiewicz reworked Sheldon's original script and it was renamed Hart to Hart, emphasizing the romantic aspect of the couple. Mankiewicz also made his directorial debut with the pilot episode as planned, and remained a creative consultant to the series afterwards. The first ten episodes were developed by Mankiewicz and the series's original story editor, Bob Shayne.

Spelling's and Goldberg's initial choice for the role of Jonathan Hart was Cary Grant. However, Grant (seventy-five years old at the time) had effectively retired from acting some years earlier; his last film, Walk, Don't Run, had been released in 1966. They then decided to find a younger actor who might embody the same style, zest and persona that Grant was famous for, and offered the role to Robert Wagner. No one else was seriously considered for the role; George Hamilton had a high profile at the time and was suggested, but Aaron Spelling said that if he was signed for the role, "the audience will resent him as Hart for being that rich. But no one will begrudge RJ [Wagner] a nickel."

ABC wanted Wagner's then-real life wife Natalie Wood to co-star with him as Jennifer Hart, but Wagner did not think it was a good idea. (Wood did make a cameo appearance in the pilot, as an actress playing Scarlett O'Hara.) Initial choices for the role of Jennifer Hart included Suzanne Pleshette, Kate Jackson (months removed from ending a three-year turn starring as detective Sabrina Duncan on Charlie's Angels) and Lindsay Wagner (no relation), but Wagner suggested Stefanie Powers, who had previously worked with him when she made a guest appearance in an episode of his action-adventure series It Takes a Thief in 1970.

Wagner wanted Sugar Ray Robinson to portray Max, but ABC-TV executives were worried about a black man as majordomo for a rich white couple. Eventually they signed Lionel Stander, who had also worked with Wagner in an episode of It Takes a Thief. In that episode, "King of Thieves," he had also played a character named Max, who was likewise a lifelong friend.

The main title theme for the series was scored by Mark Snow.

Fashion and jewelry designer Nolan Miller, who later designed the clothes for Dynasty, was the costume designer for the show.

The ranch-style house used for exterior filming had previously belonged to actors Dick Powell and his wife, June Allyson. Powell was an old friend of both Robert Wagner and Aaron Spelling. In the series, the Harts's address is given as 3100 Willow Pond Road, Bel Air: the real address of the house is 3100 Mandeville Canyon Road.

As with most of the Spelling library series under the control of Sony Pictures Television, the series was remastered from the original masters in the 2000s for widescreen high definition presentation. This version of the series is currently a regular part of the schedule for Hallmark Movies & Mysteries.

Episodes

TV movies
In 1993, almost a decade after the series ended, Wagner and Powers reunited for a series of Hart to Hart TV movies. Eight 90-minute telemovies were made in total between 1993 and 1996.  The first five aired on NBC; the final three were broadcast on The Family Channel:

Lionel Stander reprised his role as Max in five of the movies before his death from lung cancer on November 30, 1994. His last screen appearance was in Secrets of the Hart, which aired in March 1995.

Remakes
In 2002, Alan Cumming was attached to star in a series being developed for ABC that was being touted as a "gay Hart to Hart." Titled Mr and Mr Nash, the planned series featured a gay couple, both interior designers, who "stumble upon a murder each week," but it never went into production. In September of 2015, Deadline Hollywood reported that NBC had made a script commitment to a Hart to Hart remake series featuring a gay male couple. Written by Christopher Fife and produced by Carol Mendelsohn and Julie Weitz, the new series was described as "a modern and sexy retelling of the classic series that focuses on by-the-book attorney Jonathan Hart and free-spirited investigator Dan Hartman, who must balance the two sides of their life: action-packed crime-solving in the midst of newly found domesticity." But as of late September of 2020, that series was not known to be in production either.

Home media
Sony Pictures Home Entertainment released the first two seasons of Hart to Hart on DVD in Regions 1 & 2 in 2005/2006.

In 2010/2011, Sony Pictures released all eight TV movies on DVD individually via the Warner Archive Collection. These were Manufacture-on-Demand (MOD) releases and are available exclusively through WBShop.com and Amazon.com. On October 2, 2012, Sony released all eight TV movies in two volume collections titled Hart to Hart: TV Movie Collection, Volume 1 and Hart to Hart: TV Movie Collection, Volume 2. These are also manufacture-on-demand (MOD) releases, available via Amazon.com, and are part of the Sony Choice Collection.

On September 4, 2014, it was announced that Shout! Factory had acquired the rights to the series for Region 1. They released Season 3 in December 2014, Season 4 in February 2015, the fifth and final season in June 2015, and The Complete Series on May 30, 2017.

Awards and nominations

The Greatest Event in Television History (2013)
On June 6, 2013 (June 7 in the Eastern Time Zone), Adult Swim aired an edition of The Greatest Event in Television History. Hosted by Jeff Probst, the program went behind the scenes during the making of a shot-for-shot remake of the Hart to Hart opening sequence, with Adam Scott and Amy Poehler respectively in the roles of Jonathan and Jennifer Hart, and Horatio Sanz as Max. The remake followed a similar effort in the fall of 2012, adapting the opening credit sequence of Simon & Simon.

Notes

References

External links

Hart to Hart Episode guide and gallery
Opening credits of the 4th season

1979 American television series debuts
1984 American television series endings
1970s American crime drama television series
1980s American crime drama television series
1970s American mystery television series
1980s American mystery television series
American Broadcasting Company original programming
American detective television series
English-language television shows
Television series by Sony Pictures Television
Television series by Spelling Television
Television series created by Sidney Sheldon
Television shows set in Los Angeles